Anastasiya Kuliashova (born 30 November 2001) is a Belarusian swimmer. She competed in the 2020 Summer Olympics.

References

2001 births
Living people
Sportspeople from Minsk
Swimmers at the 2020 Summer Olympics
Belarusian female backstroke swimmers
Belarusian female butterfly swimmers
Belarusian female freestyle swimmers
Olympic swimmers of Belarus